Pope v. State, 396 A.2d 1054 (Md 1979), was a case decided by the Court of Appeals of Maryland that abolished the common law offense of misprision of felony on the grounds of long non-use and excessive scope that rendered it incompatible with the jurisprudence of the state.

References

U.S. state criminal case law
1979 in United States case law
Maryland state case law
1979 in Maryland
Law articles needing an infobox